The 2004 Women's Harris British Open Squash Championships was held at the Nottingham Squash Rackets Club with the later stages being held at the Albert Hall in Nottingham from 29 October - 7 November 2004. The event was won for the second consecutive year by Rachael Grinham who defeated Natalie Grainger in the final.

Seeds

Draw and results

First round

Second round

Quarter finals

Semi finals

Final

References

Women's British Open Squash Championships
Squash in England
Sport in Nottingham
Women's British Open Squash Championship
2000s in Nottingham
Women's British Open Squash Championship
British Open Squash Championship
Women's British Open Squash Championship
Women's British Open Squash Championship